Maksim Anatolievich Korzh (born November 23, 1988), professionally known as Max Korzh is a Belarusian singer and songwriter.

Biography 

At a young age Max Korzh was enrolled into music school by his parents. At the age of 16, Korzh started his first band called “Lun Clan”, alongside his friends but the band didn't last long and dissolved. Korzh was a part of a couple other projects, although none of them proved to be successful.

Korzh recorded his first solo song while studying at Belarusian State University; the biggest university in Belarus. During the 3rd year of studying at the university he decided to drop out and concentrate on his music career. He borrowed $300 dollars from his mom, went to a studio and recorded "Nebo Pomozhet Nam" (English: "Sky Will Help Us") and posted it on VKontakte, the biggest Russian social network. Shortly after he was enlisted in the military. The co-producers of the “Nebo Pomozhet Nam" were electronic duo "Magic Sound". When he returned from military service, he learned that the song went viral and gotten big in Belarus. The track “Nebo Pomozhet Nam" (English: "Sky Will Help Us") garnered a big following and got airtime on the radio. To make it gain more popularity, Korzh then proceeded to send the track to various Minsk DJ’s for them to play at parties.

Solo career 

On April 7, 2012 Korzh released his first ever music video "Nebo Pomozhet Nam" (English: Sky Will Help Us”). On May 1, 2012 he released his debut album "Zhivotniy Mir" (English: "Animal World") which consisted of 16 tracks, each written by Korzh himself. Later that same year he signed with a Russian record label: Respect Production.

When asked about the theme for his debut album by a Russian publication "Argumenty i Fakty", Korzh said in a statement:

In the early stages of 2013 Korzh went on his "The Take-Off March" tour around Belarus, Ukraine and Russia. One show took place at the Minsk Sports Palace in his home country of Belarus and he hesitated to take on the venue because he felt that "we could have lost a tonne of money" but eventually decided to go with it and the venue sold 6,500 tickets.

In the summer of 2013 Korzh was nominated as a Breakthrough Artist at Muz-TV Awards.

On November 2, 2013 Korzh had the honour of becoming the first Belarusian musical artist to have ever performed a sold-out show in Belarus, Minsk-Arena for 13,000 people.

Reputable Russian magazine ‘Afisha-Volna’ described Korzh's music as "pop-rap with club energy and street honesty" and said its "hybrid of genres presents 100% bestsellers that tend to stick in your head".
and sold out Moscow’s Luzhniki Palace of Sports.

In June 2014, Korzh won the nomination for Best Album at Muz-TV Awards for his second album "Zhit’ V Kaif".

On November 8, 2014 Korzh released his third album “Domashniy” (“Domestic/ Homely”).

In June 2015 Korzh was nominated for three awards at Muz-TV Awards: Best Hip-Hop Artist, Best Album and Best Live Show.

On December 16, 2017 Korzh now marked his second sold-out show in Minsk-Arena.

In 2016 and 2017 Korzh decided to release his fourth album in 2 parts; The first part in 2016 and the second part in 2017. He titled the fourth album "Maliy Povzroslel" (English: “The Boy Has Grown”). The first part was released in 2016, "Maliy Povzroslel, Pt.1” (English: “The Boy Has Grown Pt.1”) and the second part in 2017, "Maliy Povzroslel, Pt.2" (English: “The Boy Has Grown, Pt.2”). On December 22, 2017 his "Maliy Povzroslel" album won the VK Music Award.

In 2018 Korzh had his first ever tour of the United States.

Discography

Studio albums 

2012 — "Zhivotniy Mir" (Animal World)

2013 — "Zhit’ V Kaif" (Live Dope/ Life Is Good)

2014 — "Domashniy" (Domestic)

2016 — "Maliy Povzroslel, pt. 1" (Boy Has Grown, Pt.1)

2017 — "Domashniy (Extended Version)" (Domestic, Extended Version)

2017 — "Maliy Povzroslel, pt. 2" (Boy Has Grown, Pt.2)

2021 — "Психи попадают в топ" (Psychos Hit The Top)

Remix albums 

2016 — "Best Remixes"

Singles 

2016 — "Slovo Patsana (The Word of a Man) (Bassquaid & ST Remix)»

2016 — "Slovo Patsana (The Word of a Man) (Subranger Remix)»

2017 — "Optimist»

2018 — "Proletarka" (Proletariat Station)

2019 — "Control»

2019 — "Shantazh" (Blackmail)

2019 — "2 Tipa Lyudey" (2 Types of People)

2020 — "Raznesem" (Crash the Stadium)

Official clips

References

1988 births
21st-century Belarusian male singers
Living people
Belarusian rappers
Belarusian singer-songwriters
Russian-language singers
Hip hop singers
Ska musicians
Russian activists against the 2022 Russian invasion of Ukraine